Pierre Molinier (April 13, 1900 – March 3, 1976) was a French painter, photographer and "maker of objects".

Biography and works 
Born in Agen, France, he lived his life in Bordeaux. He began his career as a painter of landscapes until his work soon turned towards a fetishistic eroticism photography.

Molinier began to take photographs at the age of 18.

After returning from military service during 1921–1922, Molinier set out for Paris to draw from master works. Prior to Paris, he had apprenticed with his father and Pierre Augustin de Fumadelles, a sculptor. In Paris, Molinier reportedly preferred not to see too much art by the great masters as a personal manifesto on "how to create a work of art."

Moliner married Andrea Lafaye on July 7, 1931, in Bordeaux.

Molinier began a correspondence with André Breton and sent him photographs of his paintings, and was later integrated into the Surrealist group.

In 1955 Molinier made contact with the leading surrealist Andre Breton and by 1959 was showing at the International Surrealist Exhibition. At this time they defined the purpose of his art as 'for my own stimulation', indicating they future direction in one of their exhibits in the 1965 Surrealist show – a dildo.

Between 1965 and his suicide in 1976, he chronicled his exploration of his subconscious transsexual desires in "Cent Photographies Erotiques": graphically detailed images of pain and pleasure. Molinier, with the aid of a remote control switch, also began to create photographs in which he assumed the roles of dominatrix and succuba previously taken by the women of his paintings. In these black and white photographs, Molinier, either alone with doll-like mannequins or with female models, appears as a transvestite, transformed by his 'fetish' wardrobe of fishnet stockings, suspender belt, stilettos, mask and corset. In montages, an unlikely number of stockinged limbs intertwine to create the women of Molinier's paintings.

He declared that all his erotic works had been painted for his own stimulation: “In painting, I was able to satisfy my leg and nipple fetishism.” His primary interest regarding his sexuality was neither the female body or the male body; Molinier said that legs of either sex arouse him equally, as long as they are hairless and dressed up in black stockings. Regarding his dolls, he said:
“While a doll can function as a substitute for a woman, there is no movement, no life. This has a certain charm if one is before a beautiful corpse. The doll can, but does not have to become the substitute for a woman”

For the last 11 years of his life Molinier played out his own most profound moments in the 'theatre' of his Bordeaux 'boudoir – atelier'. He intended his photographs to shock, inviting the viewer to bring to the images his or her own response of excitement or disgust.

In the 1970s, Molinier's health began to decline. Like his father before them, Molinier committed suicide at 76 years of age by hanging himself in a hotel room, leaving a note saying "I’m taking my life. The key is at the concierge's"

The epitaph reads "Here lies Pierre Molinier, He was a man without morals."

Influences 
Molinier became interested in such topics after World War I when he entered a masonic order called the Brotherhood. During this time he became fascinated with ancient Egyptian and Indian religions, as well as Satanism.

Molinier explored connections between religious ritual and sexuality which he believed had been obscured by the post-Renaissance morality he so despised. He was a transvestite Baudelaire who rather than words, chose as his medium the corset, the mask and the chain. He challenges received orthodoxies of art and morality and, like a jester, seeks to destroy taboos.

Molinier echoes the ancient Shamanic tradition and experiments in sexual transformation can be interpreted as an attempt to regain the primordial, Platonic perfection of the androgyne. It is significant that his (unrealised) biography was to have been entitled The Shaman and His Creatures.

Bibliography 
Borde, Raymond/Breton, André – "Pierre Molinier", Paris, Terrain Vague, 1964.
Gorsen, Peter/Molinier Pierre – "Pierre Molinier, lui meme", Munchen, 1972.
Molinier, Pierre – "Cent photographies érotiques", Paris, Obliques, 1979.
Molinier, Pierre – Le chaman et ses créatures, Bordeaux : William Blake & Co., 1995, 96 p. [Preface by Molinier, introduction by Roland Villeneuve, photomontages, drawings and reproductions of paintings]
Petit, Pierre – Molinier, une vie d'enfer, Paris : Ramsay/Jean-Jacques Pauvert, 1992, 267 p., 86 ill. [Biography in French] and Kyoto : Jimbun Shoin, 2000, 300 p., 86 ill. [Translation in Japanese]
Petit, Pierre – Pierre Molinier et la tentation de l'Orient, Bordeaux : Opales / Pleine Page éditeurs, 2005, 64 p., 24 ill.
Oudin, Alain Molinier, une vie magique, Paris Edition en ligne Enseigne-des-oudin, 2006, 205 pages
Moi, Petit Vampire de Molinier (Interview de Michelle Sesquès. Introduction et notes de Pierre Petit, Monplaisir, 2012, 76 p., 1 ill.

See also 
Thierry Agullo
Hans Bellmer

References

External links   
Kamel Mennour – Pierre Molinier

French photographers
Gay photographers
Gay painters
French LGBT photographers
French LGBT painters
French gay artists
People from Agen
1900 births
1976 suicides
Suicides by hanging in France
1976 deaths
20th-century French LGBT people